Egremont William Lascelles (26 July 1825 – 27 October 1892) was a British Conservative Party politician.

Lascelles was the son of Henry Lascelles and Lady Louisa Thyme. In 1856, he married Jessie Elizabeth Malcolm — daughter of Neil Malcolm and Harriet Mary Clarke-Jervoise — and they had two children: Marion (died 1938) and Clare (–1883).

In 1847, Lascelles became a lieutenant captain in the Grenadier Guards and in 1852, he became major of the 1st Regiment of West York Militia. He was later also a Deputy Lieutenant.

He was elected MP for Northallerton at a by-election in 1866 but did not seek to retain the seat at the next general election in 1868.

References

External links
 

Conservative Party (UK) MPs for English constituencies
UK MPs 1865–1868
1825 births
1892 deaths